Lithium methoxide is a compound with formula LiCH3O. It is the lithium salt of methanol.  Like other alkali metal alkoxides, lithium methoxide adopts a polymeric structure Its solubility in common polar aprotic solvents like THF is low; however, it is soluble in methanol and is available commercially as a 10% solution.

See also

 Methoxide

References

Lithium salts
Alkoxides